Gold of the Amazon Women is a 1979 American TV film directed by Mark L. Lester.

Plot
An adventurer searches for treasure.

Cast
Bo Svenson as Tom Jensen
Anita Ekberg as Queen Na-Eela
Donald Pleasence as Clarence Blasko
Richard Romanus as Luis Rodriguez
Bob Minor as Noboro
Maggie Jean Smith as Reina
Bond Gideon as Taimi
Susan Miller as Oriana
Yasmine as Lee-Leeo

Production
The Los Angeles Times thought it had "its hilarious moments" but was "done in" by the "long-winded script".

References

External links
Gold of the Amazon Women at IMDb
Gold and the Amazon Women at TCMDB
Gold of the Amazon Women at BFI

1979 television films
1979 films
Films directed by Mark L. Lester